The Mueller-Wright House is located in Wrightstown, Wisconsin.

History
The house was constructed sometime during the 1840s. Currently, it serves as a museum and library. It was added to the National Register of Historic Places in 1978 and to the State Register of Historic Places in 1989.

It is regarded to be a good example of Greek Revival architecture, and to be significant for association with Hoel S. Wright and Carl G. Mueller, two men who greatly developed Wrightstown.

References

Houses on the National Register of Historic Places in Wisconsin
Libraries on the National Register of Historic Places in Wisconsin
National Register of Historic Places in Brown County, Wisconsin
Historic house museums in Wisconsin
Museums in Brown County, Wisconsin
Greek Revival architecture in Wisconsin